Influenza virus NS1A-binding protein is a protein that in humans is encoded by the IVNS1ABP gene.

In melanocytic cells IVNS1ABP gene expression may be regulated by MITF.

References

Further reading

Kelch proteins